Political officer may refer to:
Political officer (military), occasionally, a synonym for political commissar
Political officer (British Empire), in the context of the British Empire, for a pseudo-ambassadorial role in areas bordering imperial territories
Political Officer, one of five tracks for Foreign Service Officers in the United States Department of State
"The Political Officer", a story by Charles Coleman Finlay